The Sofia City Council is the legislature of the City of Sofia. It has 61 members, 27 of which are from GERB, 15 are from BSP, 12 are from Democratic Bulgaria, 5 are from Patriots for Sofia and 2 are independent.

Commissions 
The Sofia City Council has, fourteen commissions, those being:

 Assembly of the territory, architecture and housing politics (Chairperson: Silvya Hristova);
 Finances and budget (Chairperson: Stefan Markov);
 Healthcare and social policy (Chairperson: Anton Koychev);
 Protection of the environment, agriculture and forests (Chairperson: Lorita Radeva);
 Regional self-governing and regulatory use (Chairperson: Botyo Botev);
 Education, culture, science and cultural diversity (Chairperson: Malina Edreva);
 Economy, property and digital transformation (Chairperson: Nikolay Stoynev);
 Engineer infrastructure and energy planning (Chairperson: Proshko Proshkov);
 Public order and security (Chairperson: Borislav Ivanov);
 Transport and road safety (Chairperson: Carlos Contera) ;
 Children, youth and sport (Chairperson: Tatyana Georgieva);
 Connections for urban integration (Chairperson: Veselin Milev);
 Global cooperation and tourism, European programmes and projects (Chairperson: Ekaterina Yordanova);
 Commission according to the Law against corruption and unlawful property confiscation (Chairperson: Botyo Botev).

References 

City councils
Government of Sofia